HMS Skate was an  destroyer of the Royal Navy that was laid down and completed during the First World War. She was built at John Brown Shipyard at Clydebank in Scotland and launched on 11 January 1917.

Description
Armament consisted of three QF 4in Mk IV guns on the ship's centreline, with one on the forecastle, one aft on a raised platform and one between the second and third funnels. A single 2-pounder (40 mm) pom-pom anti-aircraft gun was carried, while torpedo armament consisted of two twin mounts for  torpedoes. The ship had a complement of 82 officers and ratings.

Service
Skate was one of ten  destroyers ordered by the British Admiralty in December 1915 as part of the Seventh War Construction Programme. The ship was laid down at the John Brown & Company shipyard in Clydebank during January 1916, launched in January 1917 and completed in February 1917.

On commissioning, Skate joined the 11th Destroyer Flotilla of the Grand Fleet, but was transferred to the Harwich Force to be part of the 10th Destroyer Flotilla soon after. During the First World War, Skate was torpedoed and damaged in the North Sea off the Maas Lightship by the Imperial German Navy submarine  with the loss of a crew member on 12 March 1917.

At the end of the war, Skate was transferred to Vernon as a tender to the torpedo school. The vessel was reduced to reserve complement and transferred to the depot ship  on 12 March 1920.

Skate was the sole survivor of her class by 1939, and saw extensive service during the Second World War as a convoy escort. This gave her the honour of being the oldest destroyer to see service with the Royal Navy in the latter conflict.

She was converted into a minelayer while undergoing repairs, which is likely why she remained active on the Navy List in 1939. Initially she served as an influence minesweeper to combat the threat of magnetic mines, but such was the need for escorts that she was rearmed in 1941 to take part in the Battle of the Atlantic. She was on North Atlantic duties until 1942 and was part of the escort for the Normandy landings in June 1944.

After the Second World War she was transferred back to the Torpedo school at Vernon in 1945, before being sold in 1947 and broken up in July at Newport in Wales.

References

Bibliography

 

World War II destroyers of the United Kingdom
World War I destroyers of the United Kingdom
R-class destroyers (1916)
1917 ships
Maritime incidents in 1917